Dyspessa aphrodite is a species of moth of the family Cossidae. It is found in the Peloponnese region of southern Greece.

Description
The length of the forewings is 9–10 mm. The forewings are pale yellow with a small dark spot in the discal zone and a relatively large brown spot in the postdiscal zone in the radial area, as well as a weakly expressed brown spot at the apex. The hindwings are greyish yellow.

Etymology
The species is named for Aphrodite, the goddess of love and beauty in Greek mythology.

References

External links
 

Moths described in 2007
Dyspessa
Moths of Europe